Shakura may refer to:

 Nikolai Shakura (born 1945), Belarusian astronomer
 Shakura S'Aida, Canadian jazz and blues singer

See also
 14322 Shakura, an asteroid
 Shakhura, a village in Bahrain
 Shakurov
 Shakur

References